The IRA Quartermaster General (QMG) oversaw the acquisition, concealment and maintenance of weaponry for the Irish Republican Army since its foundation in 1919. His department worked closely with the Engineering in the development of weapons.

A number of people held the post of IRA QMG. In 1997, the then QMG, Michael McKevitt, broke away from the Provisional IRA to form the Real IRA, taking weaponry to his breakaway organisation.

List of Quartermasters General of the Irish Republican Army (1917–1922)

List of Quartermasters Generals of the (anti-Treaty) Irish Republican Army (1922–1969)
Liam Mellows, 1922
Sean O'Muirthile, 1923-1924
Andrew Cooney, July 1924 – 1925
F. Cronin?
Seán Russell, 1927-1936
Mick Fitzpatrick, 1936-1937
James Hannegan, from 1937
Charlie McGlade, from 1941
Harry White, 1942-1943
Archie Doyle, 1940s
Larry Grogan, from c. 1950
Cathal Goulding, 1959-1962
Mick Ryan, from 1962(also first QMG of the Official IRA from 1969)
Prior, to 1966
Jimmy Quigley, from 1966
Pat Regan, late 1960s

List of Quartermasters Generals of the Provisional Irish Republican Army (1969–2005)
Dáithí Ó Conaill, 1969
Jack McCabe, 1969-1971
Denis McInerney, 1971-1972
Patrick Ryan, 1972-1973
Brian Keenan, from 1973
Frank Hegarty, 1980s
Kevin Hannaway, to 1985
Michael McKevitt, 1985-1997

See also
Irish Republican Army
Chief of Staff of the Irish Republican Army
IRA Director of Intelligence

References

Sources

Citations

Quartermasters
Quartermaster General